East of Hope Street is a 1998 award-winning film drama directed and produced by Nate Thomas. It was executive produced by Tim Russ (best known for his role as Lieutenant Commander Tuvok on the Star Trek: Voyager television series) who also stars in the film.  East of Hope Street had a limited release in theaters beginning on November 5, 1999 by The Cinema Guild. It had a home video street date on September 21, 2004. The gritty, urban, fact-based story is loosely based on director Nate Thomas's 10 years of experience working as a counselor in a group home for pregnant teens in Los Angeles. Russ plays a role autobiographical of Thomas. The film has been called "timely and provocative" by the Los Angeles Daily News, "an emotional and powerful film" by KCOP-TV, "stark and unflinching" by Backstage, and "a testament to the human spirit" by The Austin Chronicle.

Plot
East of Hope Street tells the real-life coming of age story of Alicia Montalvo, a teenage Salvadoran refugee caught up in the labyrinthine Los Angeles child protection system. Alicia struggles to survive the abuses of home, the inner city, and an overburdened social system in a Los Angeles most people never see.

Featured cast
 Jude Herrera (as Jade Herrera).... Alicia 
 Tim Russ.... Casey
 Magda Rivera.... Rosa
 Eve Rivera....Carmen
 Greer Bohanon.... Tameeka
 Asanio Lara.... Carlos
 Roxanne Coyne.... Bianca
 Fabiana Medici.... 
 Ranjani Brow.... Missy
 Pete Panos.... Luis
 Susanne McKenrick.... Mrs. Robertson
 Daniel Chace.... Mr. Robertson
 Joyce Rae.... Louise Carrington
 Sebastian Cetina.... Mario
 Barbara Jones.... Judge Francis Albee
 Rafael H Robledo....Mr. Valez

Awards and nominations
 Best Feature Film (New Orleans Urban Film Festival 1998)
 Best Actor Award (Jude Herrera) (New Orleans Urban Film Festival 1998)
 Best Urban Drama (New York International Independent Film Festival 1998)
 1st Place Cross Cultural (Black Filmmakers Hall of Fame Festival 1998)
 Jury Award (Hollywood Black Film Festival 1999)
 Best Feature Film nomination (Imagen Foundation 2000)
 Outstanding Performance by an Actress in a Film (Jude Herrera) (FAITA Awards 2000)

External links
 

1999 drama films
1999 films
Teenage pregnancy in film
Films about domestic violence
1990s English-language films